Phenacogrammus polli is a species of fish in the African tetra family. It is found in  middle Congo River basin in the Ruki River drainage, the Lomami river and the Lindi-Tshopo river in the Democratic Republic of the Congo Africa.

Etymology
The tetra is named in honor of Belgian ichthyologist Max Poll (1908-1991).

References

Alestidae
Freshwater fish of Africa
Taxa named by Jacques G. Lambert
Fish described in 1961